The 1998–99 Alpenliga season was the eight and final season of the multi-national Alpenliga ice hockey league. 16 teams participated in the league, and VEU Feldkirch of Austria won the championship by defeating HC Bozen of Italy in the final. The Alpenliga was replaced by the Interliga for the 1999–00.

Regular season

Playoffs

Group phase

Final
Game 1 (12. April 1999), HC Bozen – VEU Feldkirch: 0:4
Game 2 (14. April 1999), VEU Feldkirch – HC Bozen: 6:0

External links
1998-99 season

Alpenliga seasons
2
Alpenliga
Alpenliga
Alpenliga